Violet Line may refer to:
Violet Line (1914), a boundary between the Ottoman Empire and the British Empire in Arabia
Violet line piranha, a species of fish 
Violet Line (Delhi Metro), a line of the rapid transit system in Delhi, India

See also
Blue Line (disambiguation)
Purple Line (disambiguation)